Muthukkavuntanore (also spelt as Muthukavundanur or Muthugoundanur) is a small village in the Kinathukadavu block of Kinathukadavu taluk, in Tamil Nadu.

Occupation 
The main occupation is farming. Coconut, Tomato and other vegetables is the major part of farming.

Temples 
Muthumalai Murugan temple. More about the temple can be found

Climate 
As this village lies along the Palghat pass, the climate is fine throughout the year.

Villages in Coimbatore district